Tuza's conjecture is an unsolved problem in graph theory, a branch of mathematics, concerning triangles in undirected graphs.

Statement
It can be computed in polynomial time as a special case of the matroid parity problem. The quantity  is the size of the smallest "triangle-hitting set", a set of edges that touches at least one edge from each triangle.

Clearly, . For the first inequality, any triangle-hitting set must include at least one edge from each triangle of the optimal packing, and none of these edges can be shared between two or more of these triangles because the triangles are disjoint. For the second inequality, one can construct a triangle-hitting set of size  by choosing all edges of the triangles of an optimal packing.

That is, according to this unproven conjecture, every undirected graph  has a triangle-hitting set whose size is at most twice the number of triangles in an optimal packing.

History and partial results
Zsolt Tuza formulated Tuza's conjecture in 1981.

The conjecture is known to hold for planar graphs, and more generally for sparse graphs of degeneracy at most six. (Planar graphs have degeneracy at most five.) It is also known to hold for graphs of treewidth at most six, for threshold graphs, for sufficiently dense graphs, and for chordal graphs that contain a large clique. For random graphs in the Erdős–Rényi–Gilbert model, it is true with high probability.

See also
Mantel's theorem
Triangle removal lemma

References

External links

Unsolved problems in graph theory